Hunting Venus is a British television comedy-drama starring Martin Clunes and Neil Morrissey as former members of a 1980s new romantic pop group. The one-off drama was broadcast on ITV on 31 March 1999, and was produced by Buffalo Pictures for Yorkshire Television.

The plot follows former pop-star turned con artist Simon Delancey (Clunes) is kidnapped by two fans of his eighties band the Venus Hunters, and blackmailed to re-form the band for one final performance, live on television.

It features cameos from a  number of new romantic pop stars, including Simon Le Bon (with his wife Yasmin Le Bon), Tony Hadley, Gary Numan, and Phil Oakey. Jools Holland also appears, as himself, and also wrote the song "Starburst", The Venus Hunters' biggest hit.

A compilation album was also released by Columbia to accompany the drama featuring songs from the 1980s. The Hunting Venus song "Starburst" was included.

Cast
 Martin Clunes ...  Simon Delancey 
 Neil Morrissey ...  Charlotte 
 Jane Horrocks ...  Cassandra 
 Esther Coles ...  Jacqui 
 Daniel Webb ...  John
 Mark Williams ...  Peter 
 Ben Miller ...  Gavin 
 Marlene Sidaway ...  Marge Beake 
 Roger Watkins ...  DI Hoardes 
 Jean Ainslie ...  Lovely Old Lady 
 Ian Gain ...  Car Dealer 
 Dermot Keaney ...  Doctor 
 John Mackle ...  Production Assistant 
 Stephen Churchett ...  Antiques Dealer 
 Laura Heath ...  Peter's Secretary

Reception
Sam Wollaston of The Guardian felt the film "started promisingly" and "ended splendidly", however concluded that Hunting Venus "didn't really work because it's asking too much of one joke to keep it going for nearly two hours, and pastiche isn't that funny anyway, is it?" He added: "When you've got Martin Clunes and Neil Morrissey in something, you expect it to be as good as Men Behaving Badly. Which it wasn't. And Jane Horrocks as Cassandra was better than both of them."

Robert Hanks of The Independent commented that the film had a lot of "incidental pleasures" along with "one or two deft jokes about the 1980s - plus a handful of star cameos". However, he felt that the film "seemed oddly short of allusions" to the 1980s and contained "some very old-fashioned attitudes". Hanks summarised: "What the film did get right was the way that nostalgia lends cheap music its potency, and elevates our personal tragedies over world events - for the characters here, the summer of 1982 was about losing your virginity and "Hungry Like the Wolf" getting into the charts, not about the Falklands War. But it didn't need to take two hours to make that point; this was a story of lost times in a way it didn't intend."

References

External links

BFI TV & Film Database - Hunting Venus

ITV television dramas
1999 television films
1999 films
British television films
English-language television shows